Thomas Cullinan may refer to:

 Thomas A. Cullinan (1838–1904), American law enforcement officer
 Thomas Cullinan (Australian cricketer) (died 1907), Australian cricketer
 Thomas Cullinan (South African cricketer) (1946–2010), South African cricketer
 Thomas Cullinan (diamond magnate) (1862–1936), South African diamond magnate
 Thomas P. Cullinan (1919–1995), American author

See also
 Cullinan (disambiguation)